Kevin Michael Hughes (born 30 April 1973) is a British former athlete. He competed in the men's pole vault at the 2000 Summer Olympics. He represented England in the pole vault event, at the 1998 Commonwealth Games in Kuala Lumpur, Malaysia. Four years later he represented England again in the pole vault at the 2002 Commonwealth Games.

References

External links
 

1973 births
Living people
Athletes (track and field) at the 2000 Summer Olympics
British male pole vaulters
Olympic athletes of Great Britain
Athletes (track and field) at the 1998 Commonwealth Games
Commonwealth Games competitors for England